Walter Rein (10 December 1893, Stotternheim, now district of Erfurt - 18 June 1955, Berlin) was a German composer, academic, and musicologist.

External links
https://portal.dnb.de/opac.htm?method=simpleSearch&query=116415517
https://www.deutsche-digitale-bibliothek.de/entity/116415517

1893 births
1955 deaths
20th-century German composers
Musicians from Erfurt
20th-century German musicologists
Writers from Erfurt